Handaberd, also known as Lekh Castle or Lev Castle, is a 9th-century fortress located in the Kalbajar District of Azerbaijan, near the villages of Lev and , on the right bank of the Levçay River. It was built by Atrnerseh I, ruler of the Armenian Principality of Khachen, who resided there.

History 

One of several castles in the highlands of Kalbajar, Handaberd was constructed over the Ayrım Gorge, on a high mountain ridge surrounded by thick forest,  from the right bank of the Levçay River flowing by Ganlykend village. Handaberd is first mentioned as "Handu berd" by the 10th century Armenian historian Movses Kaghankatvatsi, who wrote in his work History of the Country of Albania that the fortress was built by Prince Atrnerseh of Khachen in the second quarter of the 9th century. Atrnerseh, a member of a branch of the Siunia dynasty, ruled over an area approximately corresponding to the historical Armenian province of Artsakh. Handaberd was located in the Tsar province (also known as Upper Khachen) of the Principality of Khachen․ It served as Atrnerseh's residence as well as a prison for prisoners sentenced to death.

According to the inscription on one of the khachkars kept at Dadivank, a nearby Armenian monastery, from 1142 to 1182 Handaberd belonged to Hasan I Vakhtangyan, prince of Upper Khachen. Some time after the initial construction under Atrnerseh, the fortress was significantly expanded. Around 1250, the fortress is mentioned in the history written by the Armenian historian Kirakos Gandzaketsi.  According to one legend, the fortress was repaired using funds sent by Levon I, King of Cilician Armenia, and called Levonaberd (see variations thereof below) in his honor.

Handaberd's inscriptions were studied by the French orientalist Marie-Félicité Brosset in the mid-19th century. Less than a kilometer to the east of the fortress is a medieval monastery complex bearing the same name, which has also been excavated.

The fortress has historically been referred to by various names and renderings, such as Lev (also the Armenian name for the Levçay River), Levaghala, Levkala, Levonaberd, Lohaberd, Handberd, and Handuberd.

Features 
The castle is surrounded by steep rocks and streams from three sides, and looks like a natural rock relief. The only entrance to the castle is from the gates on the north-eastern edge. The internal castle is in the higher south-western corner. Nowadays, the walls are in ruins. Around Handaberd fortress, there are other smaller satellite castles on surrounding mountain peaks such as Pahak or Garavul (both meaning guard) and Jomard castles. Close to the Handaberd fortress there are two caves where archaeologists found items indicating the early presence of human beings.

The castle is designated as a place bearing state historical importance in Azerbaijan.

Gallery

See also 
 Kalbajar
 Shusha State Historical and Architectural Reserve

References

External links 
About Handaberd

Monuments and memorials in Azerbaijan
Palaces in Azerbaijan
Tourist attractions in Azerbaijan
Architecture in Azerbaijan
Castles and fortresses in Azerbaijan